Christina Kokubo (July 27, 1950 in Detroit, Michigan – June 9, 2007) was an American film and television actress; she was also a drama teacher.

Career
Kokubo appeared in several feature films, including The Yakuza (1975), a neo-noir gangster film set in Japan, and Midway (1976), in which she played a Japanese-American who has a troubled romance with a white naval officer during World War II.

She also appeared in several television productions, including appearing as Paramedic Faith Yee in thirteen episodes (1984–1988) of St. Elsewhere, a medical-drama television series. Additionally, Kokubo participated in several documentary films about the yakuza crime syndicate in Japan.

In 1984, Kokubo portrayed a samurai's wife in Three Confessions at the Cast-at-the-Circle theater.

Teaching and legacy
For seven years, Kokubo taught acting classes at the Braille Institute in Los Angeles, California. Spearheading the Los Angeles premier non-profit theater for the blind called "Changing Perceptions". Kokubo's Class — a non-profit organization that offers drama therapy to the disabled in the Los Angeles area, is named in her memory.

Death
Christina Kokubo died in 2007, at age 56, of complications from breast cancer.

Filmography

Notes

External links

1950 births
2007 deaths
20th-century American actresses
Actresses from Detroit
American actresses of Japanese descent
American film actors of Asian descent
American film actresses
American television actresses
Deaths from cancer in California
Deaths from breast cancer
Drama teachers
Place of death missing
21st-century American women